Ptyssophlebia is a genus of moths in the family Lasiocampidae. The genus was erected by Emilio Berio in 1937.

Species
Ptyssophlebia avis Berio, 1937
Ptyssophlebia meridionalis Tams, 1936

References 

Lasiocampidae